Score No. 1 (Dream:Chase) in A major, Op. 17 for Three Electric Guitars, One Bass Guitar and One Drum Kit is the second film score by indie rock and film score outfit Shorthand Phonetics. It is the main instrumental accompaniment to the indie movie, Dream:Chase. This score topped the  Jakarta Globe's list for the "Top 5 Indonesian Albums of ’09".

Track listing

References

Film scores
2009 soundtrack albums